Monette Simone Russo (born 4 August 1988 in Lilydale, Victoria) is an Australian former artistic gymnast. She made history by becoming the first Australian gymnast ever to win an individual world championship medal at the 2005 World Artistic Gymnastics Championships in Melbourne, Australia, when she came third in the all-around competition and also was awarded the prestigious Longines Prize for Elegance. She also competed in three apparatus finals, finishing seventh on bars and fifth on beam and floor. Although more of an all-arounder than an events finalist, during her career she was one of the few women competing two vaults. She was also a part of the 2003 World Championships Team for Australia and won a bronze medal, another first for Australian gymnastics.

Monette is an Olympian, having helped Australia to 8th place in the team event at the 2004 Olympics. An injury prevented her from competing in the all-around final.

Injury also marred Monette's 2006 season. She competed at the Commonwealth Games in Melbourne, and although she had to reduce her difficulty considerably because of her injury (only one double salto on floor, for example) she still assisted Australia to the team gold. Having qualified to the all-around, bars, and beam finals, three more medals looked likely. However, injury prevented Monette from competing in the all-around, and she fell off the beam, while receiving a bronze on bars behind Elyse Hopfner-Hibbs and Shavahn Church.

Monette retired from elite gymnastics in May 2007.

External links
 
 Monette Russo Online

1988 births
Living people
Australian female artistic gymnasts
Olympic gymnasts of Australia
Gymnasts at the 2004 Summer Olympics
Gymnasts at the 2006 Commonwealth Games
Commonwealth Games gold medallists for Australia
Medalists at the World Artistic Gymnastics Championships
Commonwealth Games bronze medallists for Australia
Commonwealth Games medallists in gymnastics
21st-century Australian women
People from Lilydale, Victoria
Sportspeople from Melbourne
Sportswomen from Victoria (Australia)
Medallists at the 2006 Commonwealth Games